Cercosaura eigenmanni, known commonly as Eigenmann's prionodactylus, is a species of lizard in the family Gymnophthalmidae. The species is endemic to South America

Etymology
The specific name, eigenmanni, is in honor of German-born American ichthyologist Carl H. Eigenmann.

Geographic range
C. eigenmanni is found in Bolivia, Brazil, and Peru.

Description

Habitat

Reproduction
C. eigenmanni is oviparous.

References

Further reading
Doan, Tiffany M. (2003). "A new phylogenetic classification for the gymnophthalmid genera Cercosaura, Pantodactylus and Prionodactylus (Reptilia: Squamata)". Zoological Journal of the Linnean Society 137 (1): 101–115. (Cercosaura eigenmanni, new combination).
Freitas MA, França DPF, Veríssimo D (2011). "First record of Cercosaura eigenmanni (Griffin, 1917) (Squamata: Gymnophthalmidae) for the state of Acre, Brazil". Check List 7 (4): 516.
Griffin, Lawrence Edmonds (1917). "A List of the South American Lizards of the Carnegie Museum, With Descriptions of Four New Species". Annals of the Carnegie Museum 11: 304-320 + Plates XXXII-XXXV. (Prionodactylus eigenmanni, new species, pp. 316-317 + Plate XXXV).

Cercosaura
Reptiles described in 1917
Taxa named by Lawrence Edmonds Griffin